The 2008–10 European Nations Cup First Division was the 7th edition of the championship since it was reformed in 2000. The championship not only determined the champions of the ENC but it also acted as an element of European qualification for the 2011 Rugby World Cup in New Zealand.

At present, there is no promotion or relegation between the European Nations Cup and the Six Nations. The current champions are Georgia, who won the 2011 First Division.

The top two teams, Georgia and Russia, qualified directly to the 2011 Rugby World Cup, and the third placed team, Romania, entered the European qualification playoffs. These playoffs included the champion of Division 2A and the leaders of the lower ENC divisions (excluding 3D) at the end of the 2008–09 season.  Romania emerged as the winner of the playoff series and will go on to play Tunisia, the second place African qualifier, in the semifinals of the Rugby World Cup 2011 20th Place Playoff for the last spot in the 2011 Rugby World Cup finals.

This season saw Germany in the First Division for the first time since the divisional system was created, replacing Czech Republic who were relegated to Division 2A.

The divisions play on a two-year cycle with the teams playing each other both home and away. From 2009 onward, the title is assigned according to a one-year ranking. So Georgia won the 2009 title  and Romania the title for 2010. The same for the 2011–12 period.

Season 2009

Table points are determined as follows:
 3 points for a win
 2 points for a draw
 1 point for a loss
 0 points for a forfeit

Season 2010 

 ''The scheduled match between Romania and Spain on February 6, 2010 was postponed due to snow and freezing weather in Bucharest on the planned matchday, and was rescheduled to March 27.

Table 2008–10
The cumulated table from both years, 2009–2010, decided which teams qualify directly to 2011 Rugby World Cup, which  team goes through Play-off qualification rounds and which team is relegated to Division 1B for the 2010–12 season.

See also
 European Nations Cup
 2008–2010 European Nations Cup Second Division
 2008–2010 European Nations Cup Third Division
 Germany at the 2008–10 European Nations Cup

References

External links
 2008/10 – ENC Division 1 – RWC2011 FIRA – Association of European Rugby website

2008-10
2008–09 in European rugby union
2009–10 in European rugby union
Europe
Europe
Europe
2008–09 in Spanish rugby union
2009–10 in Spanish rugby union
2008–09 in German rugby union
2009–10 in German rugby union
2008 in Russian rugby union
2009 in Russian rugby union
2010 in Russian rugby union
2008–09 in Romanian rugby union
2009–10 in Romanian rugby union
Germany at the European Nations Cup